The 21st edition of the Vuelta Ciclista de Chile was held from March 19 to March 29, 1998, in Southern Chile over a distance of 1519 km.

Stages

1999-03-19: Pelluco — Puerto Montt (4.2 km)

1999-03-20: Puerto Montt — Osorno (137.4 km)

1999-03-21: Osorno — Valdivia (137.4 km)

1999-03-22: Valdivia — Temuco (172.6 km)

1999-03-23: Temuco — Los Angeles (201.2 km)

1999-03-24: Los Angeles — Concepción (143.6 km)

1999-03-25: Concepción — Chillán (164.6 km)

1999-03-26: Chillán — Talca (161.6 km)

1999-03-27: San Clemente — Curicó (100.7 km)

1999-03-27: Comallé — Curicó (15.3 km)

1999-03-28: Curicó — Rancagua (188 km)

1998-03-29: Santiago (Circuito "Providencia") (71.4 km)

Final Classification

References 
 Cyclingnews

Vuelta Ciclista de Chile
Vuelta Ciclista
1998 in road cycling
March 1998 sports events in South America